Eupithecia edwardsi is a moth in the family Geometridae. It was described by David Stephen Fletcher in 1951 and is found in Uganda.

References

Endemic fauna of Uganda
Moths described in 1951
edwardsi
Insects of Uganda
Moths of Africa